Knut Håkon Tangen (21 May 1928 – 2 April 2007 in Hurdalssjøen) is a Norwegian speed skater.  He competed at the 1956 Winter Olympics, where he placed 19th in the 10,000 metre.

References

External links 
 

1928 births
2007 deaths
Norwegian male speed skaters
Olympic speed skaters of Norway
Speed skaters at the 1956 Winter Olympics